Johannes Magirus (c. 1560 – 1596) was a German physician and natural philosopher. He was born at Fritzlar about 1560; his background was Lutheran. He studied at the University of Padua, and took a medical degree at the University of Marburg in 1585.

Works
Physiologiae Peripateticae libri sex (1597). This was a textbook treatment of Aristotelian philosophy, and was still in use 50 years later. It was employed to teach physics in the early years of Harvard College. Isaac Newton was introduced to natural philosophy by this work of Magirus and one of Daniel Stahl. It used the works of: Hermolao Barbaro, Gasparo Contarini, Thomas Erastus, Philipp Melanchthon, Arcangelus Mercenarius, Francesco Patrizzi, Julius Caesar Scaliger, Jakob Schegk, Johannes Velcurio, Francesco Vimercato, and Jacopo Zabarella.

Notes

1560s births
1596 deaths
Year of birth uncertain
16th-century German physicians
German philosophers
Natural philosophers
16th-century German writers
16th-century German male writers
Expatriates of the Holy Roman Empire in Italy